Town and Country is a city in west St. Louis County, Missouri, United States with a population of 11,640 as of the 2020 census. It is home to Missouri Baptist Medical Center, (locally known as MoBap).

Town and Country has the highest median household income ($134,387 in 2009) of any city in Missouri with a population over 10,000 and also has one of the highest median incomes of any city in the United States. The city is included in the St. Louis, MO-IL Metropolitan Statistical Area, and is home to Bellerive Country Club, which hosted the 1965 U.S. Open, the 1992 PGA Championship, and the 2018 PGA Championship.

Geography
Town and Country is located at  (38.631002, −90.471581).

City landscape

Originally, it was primarily made up of large residential lots. The community first incorporated in 1950 as a village. The incorporation and establishment of a combination Public Safety Department providing three firefighters and one police officer on duty was to provide lower fire insurance rates for residents. The Village changed to city status in 1974 in an effort to increase property taxes. The maximum "Village" tax rate could no longer sustain the modest city government. In 1983 annexation of a large area to the west more than doubled the size of the city. This caused the city to maintain a police department and contract fire and EMS service to a neighboring fire district.

The original country charm of larger lots with white fences and grazing horses is hard to find, however there are a few exceptions. There are several large tracts of land that remain undeveloped. The area offers a quiet, restful, green residential landscape, in contrast to the more intensely developed areas typical of St. Louis County. There are relatively few commercial development areas. The predominant commercial locations tend to be at the periphery of the city boundaries along the regional arterials, and/or at the intersections of the major roads.

History
Town and Country was incorporated in 1950 as a village, and re-incorporated as a fourth-class city 25 years later.

Demographics

2020 census
As of the 2020 census there were 11,640 people and 4,085 households. The racial makeup of the city was 77.0% White, 2.6% African American, 0.1% Native American, 10.9% Asian, 1.1% from other races, and 8.3% from two or more races. Hispanic or Latino of any race were 6.5% of the population.

2010 census
At the 2010 census there were 10,815 people, 3,591 households, and 2,798 families living in the city. The racial makeup of the city was 87.8% White, 2.6% African American, 0.1% Native American, 7.5% Asian, 0.1% Pacific Islander, 0.4% from other races, and 1.6% from two or more races. Hispanic or Latino of any race were 1.7%.

Of the 3,591 households 30.6% had children under the age of 18 living with them, 72.2% were married couples living together, 4.0% had a female householder with no husband present, 1.8% had a male householder with no wife present, and 22.1% were non-families. 17.9% of households were one person and 9.9% were one person aged 65 or older. The average household size was 2.66 and the average family size was 3.02.

The median age was 48.6 years. 21.9% of residents were under the age of 18; 10.1% were between the ages of 18 and 24; 12.3% were from 25 to 44; 32.4% were from 45 to 64; and 23.1% were 65 or older. The gender makeup of the city was 46.5% male and 53.5% female.

2000 census
At the 2000 census there were 10,894 people, 3,593 households, and 2,849 families living in the city. The racial makeup of the city was 90.16% White, 2.01% African American, 0.06% Native American, 6.33% Asian, 0.01% Pacific Islander, 0.23% from other races, and 1.20% from two or more races. Hispanic or Latino of any race were 1.07%.

Of the 3,593 households 33.6% had children under the age of 18 living with them, 74.0% were married couples living together, 4.1% had a female householder with no husband present, and 20.7% were non-families. 18.7% of households were one person and 10.6% were one person aged 65 or older. The average household size was 2.69 and the average family size was 3.08.

The age distribution was 22.8% under the age of 18, 7.3% from 18 to 24, 16.9% from 25 to 44, 31.1% from 45 to 64, and 21.8% 65 or older. The median age was 47 years. For every 100 females, there were 87.7 males. For every 100 females age 18 and over, there were 81.5 males.

The median household income was $139,967 and the median family income  was $167,875. Males had a median income of $100,000 versus $41,691 for females. The per capita income for the city was $69,347.

Economy
Energizer Holdings, Solutia and Savvis are headquartered in Town and Country.

Education
The public school district for most of Town and Country is the Parkway C-2 School District. Parkway operates Mason Ridge Elementary School in Town and Country. Other portions are in the Kirkwood R-VII School District and the Ladue School District.

Special School District of St. Louis County, a county-wide school district for disabled children, has the following in Town and Country: its administrative offices, and Neuwoehner High School in Town and Country.

Private schools:
The Principia is a private school for Christian Scientists located on a  campus in Town and Country.
Visitation Academy of St. Louis, a Catholic private all-girls school, is also located in Town and Country.
All-boys Catholic high school Christian Brothers College High School is located on the North Forty Outer Road.
In 2011, Westminster Christian Academy relocated to a new campus off Maryville Centre Drive.

Tertiary facilities in Town and Country:
Maryville University is located in Town and Country.

Notable people
 Bob Costas, NBC sports commentator
 Dan Dierdorf, NFL Hall of Famer
 Torry Holt, St. Louis Rams wide receiver
 Rodger O. Riney, Scottrade CEO
 Michael Roarty, Anheuser Busch marketing executive, created "This Bud's for you" slogan
 Red Schoendienst, Major League Baseball Hall of Famer, home
 Patrick Stokes, Anheuser Busch chairman
 Ozzie Smith, Major League Baseball Hall of Famer
 Todd Worrell, former Major League Baseball pitcher and 1986 National League Rookie of the Year
Town and Country is a common birthplace of record for the surrounding area because of its inclusion of Missouri Baptist Medical Center.

References

Cities in St. Louis County, Missouri
Cities in Missouri